Rani Kamalesvaran (born 1971), who performs as Rani is an Australian singer. Her debut single "Always on My Mind" reached No. 33 on the ARIA singles chart, was on high rotation nationally on Triple J and was nominated for 1997 ARIA Awards for Best New Talent and Best Pop Release.

Career
Rani is the daughter of Australian-based singer, Kamahl, and his wife, Sahodra. She first came to notice by providing the vocals on "I Have a Dream" by Hatman and as a result signed with Virgin. Her first single "Always On My Mind" was released in mid 1997 and she followed up with "Trust in Me" later that year. In 1998 she issued "Living in Shadows", which was followed by her debut album, The Infinite Blue, released in August 1998.

Discography

Albums

Singles

Awards and nominations

ARIA Music Awards
The ARIA Music Awards is an annual awards ceremony that recognises excellence, innovation, and achievement across all genres of Australian music.

|-
| rowspan="2"| 1997
| rowspan="2"| "Always On My Mind"
| Best Pop Release
| 
|-
| Best New Talent
| 
|-

References

1971 births
Australian musicians
Living people